The National Basketball League of Canada's Rookie of the Year Award is an annual National Basketball League of Canada (NBL) award given to the top rookie of the regular season. From 2012 to 2014, the league announced the honoree during All-Star Weekend.

Winners

References 

National Basketball League of Canada awards